Shenzhou 2 launched on January 9, 2001, was the second unmanned launch of the Shenzhou spacecraft. Inside the reentry capsule were a monkey, a dog and a rabbit in a test of the spaceship's life support systems. The reentry module separated from the rest of the spacecraft after just over seven days in orbit, with the orbital module staying in orbit for another 220 days.

Shenzhou 2 tested the spacecraft much more rigorously than its predecessor Shenzhou 1. After being launched into a 196.5 by 333.8 km orbit, 20.5 hours after launch it circularised its orbit to 327.7 by 332.7 km. Around 1220 UTC on January 12 it once again changed its orbit to 329.3 by 339.4 km. A third orbit change came on January 15 328.7 by 345.4 km.

As well as the animal cargo, there were 64 different scientific payloads. 15 were carried in the reentry module, 12 in the orbital module and 37 on the forward external pallet. These included a microgravity crystallography experiment; animal species including six mice, and small aquatic and terrestrial organisms; cosmic ray and particle detectors and a gamma ray burst detectors. To test the radio transmitting systems taped messages were broadcast from the spacecraft.

Successful reentry and failed landing
The signal for retrofire was sent at about 1015 UTC on January 16 as the spacecraft passed over the South Atlantic Ocean off the coast of South Africa. It landed in Inner Mongolia at 11:22 UTC. No photos were released of the landing capsule leading to some speculation that the reentry was not completely successful, though Chinese officials kept silent, only responded anomaly. The Swedish Space Center news site reported that an unnamed source said one of the connections from the capsule to the single parachute failed leading to a hard landing. Later in 2017, it was revealed by Yang Liwei that the parachutes failed to open upon re-entry, which resulted in hard-landing. Some of the cargo was slightly burned.

The mission of the orbital module continued until it was commanded to fire its rockets to initiate reentry on August 24. It reentered over the western Pacific Ocean between Easter Island and Chile.

Mission parameters 

 Mass: 7,400 kg
 Perigee: 330 km
 Apogee: 346 km
 Inclination: 42.6°
 Period: 91.3 minutes
 NSSDC ID: 2001-001A

See also 

 Chinese space program
 Tiangong program
 Shenzhou spacecraft
 Long March rocket
 Jiuquan Satellite Launch Center
 Animals in space

References

External links 
 Shenzhou images from Go Taikonauts!



Shenzhou 02
2001 in China
Spacecraft launched in 2001